Swaziland competed in the Summer Olympic Games for the first time at the 1972 Summer Olympics in Munich, West Germany. Two competitors, both male, took part in four events in two sports.

Athletics

Men

Shooting

Open

References

External links
Official Olympic Reports

Nations at the 1972 Summer Olympics
1972
1972 in Swaziland